Elections for Cambridge City Council (in Cambridge, England) were held on Thursday 5 May 2011.  As the council is elected by thirds, one seat in each of the wards was up for election, with the exception of Cherry Hinton ward where two seats were up for election due to the early retirement of Councillor Stuart Newbold. The vote took place alongside the 2011 United Kingdom Alternative Vote referendum and a Cambridgeshire County Council by-election for Arbury ward.

Result summary

This result has the following consequences for the total number of seats on the Council after the elections:

The Liberal Democrats retained control of the council, albeit with a reduced majority.

Ward results

Note: in results where, in previous elections, two seats were up for election the party share of the vote is based on an average for those candidates who stood for that particular party in the election.

Changes in party vote is in comparison with the 2010 Cambridge City Council election results.

Abbey ward

Councillor Caroline Hart was defending her Abbey seat for the Labour Party.

Arbury ward

Councillor Alan Levy was defending his Arbury seat for the Liberal Democrats.

Castle ward

Councillor Tania Zmura retired her seat. Philip Tucker was aiming to retain the vacated seat for the Liberal Democrats.

Cherry Hinton ward

Due to the retirement of Labour Party Councillor Stuart Newbold, two seats were up for election. Councillor Russ McPherson was defending his seat for the Labour Party.

Coleridge ward

Councillor Jeremy Benstead was defending his Coleridge seat for the Labour Party.

East Chesterton ward

Councillor Clare Blair was defending her East Chesterton seat for the Liberal Democrats.

King's Hedges ward

Councillor Mike Pitt was defending his King's Hedges seat for the Liberal Democrats.

Market ward

Councillor Michael Dixon retired his seat. Andrea Reiner was aiming to retain the vacated seat for the Liberal Democrats.

Newnham ward

Councillor Julie Smith was defending her Newnham seat for the Liberal Democrats.

Petersfield ward

Councillor Lucy Walker retired her Petersfield seat. Kevin Blencowe was aiming to retain the vacated seat for the Labour Party.

Queen Edith's ward

Councillor Viki Sanders retired her Queen Edith's seat. George Pippas was aiming to retain the vacated seat for the Liberal Democrats.

Romsey ward

Councillor Raj Shah was defending his Romsey seat for the Liberal Democrats.

Trumpington ward

Councillor Andy Blackhurst was defending his Trumpington seat for the Liberal Democrats.

West Chesterton ward

Councillor Damien Tunnacliffe was defending his West Chesterton seat for the Liberal Democrats.

Cambridgeshire County Council by-election for Arbury division

Arbury division

Following the retirement of County Councillor Rupert Moss-Eccardt, the Cambridgeshire County Council seat for Arbury was vacant. Amy Ellis was aiming to retain the seat for the Liberal Democrats.

Alternative Vote referendum result for Cambridge

Cambridge was one of the few areas of the country that voted "yes" for the Alternative Vote in the referendum held on 5 May 2011.  The result was as follows:

References

2011 English local elections
2011
2010s in Cambridge